Piscataway may refer to:

Piscataway people, a Native American ethnic group native to the southern Mid-Atlantic States
Piscataway language
Piscataway, Maryland, an unincorporated community
Piscataway, New Jersey, a township
Piscataway Creek, Maryland
Piscataway Creek (Virginia)
Piscataway Park
Piscataway-Conoy Tribe of Maryland, North American Indian tribe recognized by the state of Maryland
Piscataway Indian Nation and Tayac Territory, state-recognized tribe in Maryland 
Siege of Piscataway, armed rebellion held by Virginia settlers that took place from 1676 to 1677

See also
Piscataway Park, Maryland
Piscataway Indian Nation and Tayac Territory, one of three contemporary Piscataway tribes
Piscataqua (disambiguation)

Language and nationality disambiguation pages